A sherpa is an experienced Washington D.C. political consultant brought on to guide an administration's nominee to Senate approval.

History of the usage

Sherpa is a word taken from the language of the Sherpa, a nomadic people of the Himalayas. It literally means "people of the East." The English word "sherpa" originally referred to people hired as porters and guides by climbers of the Himalayan Mountains. Sherpas have a long history of helping to navigate difficult mountain terrain. Senate confirmation has been compared to mountain climbing, dangerous and exhausting. Like the Himalayan climbers, nominees need guides "through the obstacle course of interviews and hearings."

Role of the sherpa
Supreme Court and top cabinet post nominations have become increasingly partisan and contentious. Nominees for these positions now have designated sherpas with extensive political experience and are reliable. Sub-cabinet nominees are generally handled by department level political staff. The role of chief strategist and stage manager, to get someone confirmed, is unpaid, largely out of public view and without official title. The role has many facets:
Media messenger - shaping the candidates image, devising strategies to deal with reporters and coordinating calls with key senators
Traffic cop, everybody wants a bit of time with the nominee.
Liaison with both the senate and the administration; act as escort for nominee to meet senators and be an adviser for the president
Coach - what to say and when to say it and how to have proper demeanor -  low profile, suitably humble, deferential, polite and persuasive in answering questions
Confidant and sounding board  
Counselor and hand holder

Notable sherpas and nominees

Kelly Ayotte for Justice Neil Gorsuch
John Kyl for Justice Brett Kavanaugh
Ken Duberstein for Justices David Souter and Clarence Thomas
Fred D. Thompson and Ed Gillespie for Chief Justice John Roberts
Michael S. Berman for Justices Stephen Breyer and Ruth Bader Ginsburg
Doug Jones for Justice Ketanji Brown Jackson
Cynthia Hogan for Justice Sonia Sotomayor
Tom Korologos for Vice-president Nelson Rockefeller, Chief Justice William Rehnquist, and Justice Antonin Scalia,

See also
Sherpa (emissary)

References

Political consultants
Supreme Court of the United States